The following are the national records in Olympic weightlifting in Slovakia. Records are maintained in each weight class for the snatch lift, clean and jerk lift, and the total for both lifts by the Slovak Weightlifting Federation (Slovenský zväz vzpierania).

Current records

Men

Women

Historical records

Men (1998–2018)

Women (1998–2018)

References
General
Slovak records 
Specific

External links
Slovak Weightlifting Federation website
Slovak historical records

Slovakia
records
Olympic weightlifting
weightlifting